Frank Pearson (born 18 May 1884) was an English footballer who played in the Football League for Chelsea, Hull City, Manchester City and Preston North End.

References

1884 births
Date of death unknown
English footballers
English Football League players
Preston North End F.C. players
Manchester City F.C. players
Chelsea F.C. players
Hull City A.F.C. players
Luton Town F.C. players
Rochdale A.F.C. players
Footballers from Manchester
Association football forwards